Tag the Gag is a very short-lived television series which aired in August 1951 on NBC. According to IMDb, it lasted two episodes. It was a panel game show, a popular genre at the time. However, Tag the Gag proved unsuccessful with viewers and critics. It was hosted by Hal Block, best known as a regular panelist on the popular and well-received series What's My Line?. Also featured were Morey Amsterdam, Harvey Stone, Herkle Stiles, and Jean Carroll. The archival status of the series is not known, and it is possible (though not confirmed) that it was wiped.

Reception
Bob Lanigan for the Brooklyn Eagle called the series "a 1946 TV version of the 1940 Can You Top This? radio show" and complained of the "weak gags based on old and very tired jokes".

References

External links
Tag the Gag on IMDb

1951 American television series debuts
1951 American television series endings
1950s American game shows
American panel games
Black-and-white American television shows
NBC original programming